Ian Maxwell is a British businessman.

Ian Maxwell may also refer to:

 Ian Maxwell (footballer) (born 1975), Scottish football player and executive
 Ian Maxwell (tracker)